Bathmen is a village and former municipality in the east of the Netherlands. The municipality was merged with her larger neighbour of Deventer on 1 January 2005 as part of a national effort to reduce bureaucracy in the country. Its main population centres were Apenhuizen, Bathmen, Dortherhoek, Loo, Pieriksmars and Zuidloo.

It was first mentioned in 1284 as Batmen. The etymology is unclear. In 1840, it was home to 1,507 people. In 1997, Deventer tried to annex Bathmen, but failed.

Gallery

References

External links

Municipalities of the Netherlands disestablished in 2005
Former municipalities of Overijssel
Populated places in Overijssel
Deventer